Time is the twenty-eighth studio album by Rod Stewart, it was released on 3 May 2013 in the UK, on 7 May in the US and Canada, and on 8 May in Japan under the title . The album entered the top 10 in the US and entered the UK Albums Chart at No. 1, setting a new British record for the longest gap between chart-topping albums by an artist, as his last studio album to reach the top spot was A Night on the Town in 1976. The album was certified platinum in the UK on 16 August 2013 and double-platinum on 29 December 2017. Overall, the album was the No. 7 best-selling album of 2013 in the UK.  In the United States, the album has sold 141,000 copies as of September 2015.

Singles and other releases

"It's Over" is the album's lead European single and it joined BBC Radio 2's playlist in  April 2013 and Kingstown Radio's new music file; the single peaked at No. 91 on the UK Singles Chart. In North America, the album's lead single, "She Makes Me Happy", peaked at No. 12 on the Billboard Adult Contemporary chart. Both singles were accompanied by music videos directed by Cameron Duddy. The third single, "Brighton Beach", followed shortly after, with the music video directed by Zach Merck. "Beautiful Morning" was originally available by download in 2012 via a code found inside the CD booklet for his Christmas album Merry Christmas, Baby, albeit differing from the final mix included on the Time album.

In the UK, a deluxe 2-disc version of the album was released on 2 December 2013. It contains live tracks from his 2013 performance at The Troubadour, West Hollywood as well as all the bonus tracks previously available on the UK and US/Canada deluxe editions of the album; the live songs include 6 songs from the Time album as well as previous hits. Ahead of the release of the 2-disc version of the album, "Can't Stop Me Now" was released as a single and peaked at No. 22 on the US Billboard Adult Contemporary chart and at No. 199 on the UK Singles Chart. "Sexual Religion" was also released as a single in the US, where it peaked at No. 45 on Billboard's "Dance/Club Songs" chart.

Track listing

Personnel 
 Rod Stewart – lead vocals 
 Kevin Savigar – keyboards (1, 2, 3, 5, 7, 10, 12), programming (1, 2, 5, 7, 10), string arrangements and conductor (3, 12), celesta (6), acoustic piano (12)
 Chuck Kentis – keyboards (3, 6, 10), guitars (3), string arrangements (3, 4), accordion (4), programming (6), harmonica (6), acoustic piano (9), Hammond B3 organ (11)
 Emerson Swinford – guitars (1, 2, 3, 5, 7, 8, 10), mandolin (1, 5), dulcimer (1), acoustic guitar, electric guitar (6), slide guitar (11)
 Jim Cregan – acoustic guitar (4)
 Don Kirkpatrick – 12-string guitar, electric guitar (5), acoustic guitar (6, 9), guitars (11)
 Paul Warren – electric guitar (9), guitars (11)
 Conrad Korsch – bass guitar (3, 4, 5, 8, 9, 11)
 Kenny Aronoff – drums (1, 5), tambourine (1)
 David Palmer – drums (3, 9, 11)
 Matt O'Connor – maracas (1, 7, 8), shaker (1), tambourine (6, 7)
 J'Anna Jacoby – violin (1, 6, 11), strings (4, 9), mandolin (6)
 Jimmy Roberts – saxophone (5, 7, 10)
 Nick Lane – trombone (7)
 Lee Thornburg – trumpet (7)
 Sandy Chilla – backing vocals (1, 2, 6, 11)
 Sharlotte Gibson – backing vocals (1, 11)
 Di Reed – backing vocals (1, 3, 5-8, 10, 11)
 Lucy Woodward – backing vocals (1, 3, 5-8, 10)
 Bridget Anne Cady – backing vocals (5, 10)
 Kim Johnson – backing vocals (5, 6, 7, 10)
 Angela Fisher – backing vocals (8)
 Angela Michael – backing vocals (11)

Production 
 Producer – Rod Stewart 
 Co-Producers – Kevin Savigar (Tracks 1, 2, 3, 5-8 & 10); Chuck Kentis (Tracks 3, 9 & 11); Jim Cregan (Track 4).
 Engineered and Mixed by Kevin Savigar
 Additional Engineer – Tom Weir
 Strings recorded by Dave Blanco
 Mastered by Bernie Grundman at Bernie Grundman Mastering (Hollywood, CA).
 Art Direction and Design – Julian Peploe
 Cover and Principal Photos – Penny Lancaster
 Additional Photography – Lotus Donovan and Cammy Kinney
 Management – Arnold Stiefel at Stiefel Management.

Charts and certifications

Charts

Year-end charts

Certifications

References

Rod Stewart albums
2013 albums
Capitol Records albums
Albums produced by Rod Stewart
Albums recorded at RAK Studios
Albums recorded at Sunset Sound Recorders